Paul Texier (28 April 1889 – 29 February 1972) was a French cyclist. He competed in six events at the 1908 Summer Olympics.

References

External links
 

1889 births
1972 deaths
French male cyclists
Olympic cyclists of France
Cyclists at the 1908 Summer Olympics
Place of birth missing